George Kiefer (born c. 1971) is the head men's soccer coach at North Carolina State University, where he has served since 2017. He was the 2005 NSCAA South Region Coach of the Year, and led the South Florida Bulls from 2002 until 2016. He posted a 162-84-47 record as head coach there and won five conference championships. His Bulls reached the Elite Eight twice.

He also served as an assistant coach at UConn.

Prior to the 2017 season, Kiefer was selected to replace Kelly Findley as the NC State Wolfpack head coach.

Head coaching record

References

External links
George Kiefer

South Florida Bulls men's soccer coaches
NC State Wolfpack men's soccer coaches
1970s births
Living people
Southern Connecticut Fighting Owls men's soccer players
People from Bay Shore, New York
UConn Huskies men's soccer coaches
Association football defenders
American soccer coaches
Association football players not categorized by nationality